Pingeot is a French surname. Notable people with the surname include:

 Anne Pingeot (born 1943), French art historian, mistress of François Mitterrand
 Mazarine Pingeot (born 1974), French writer, journalist, and professor, daughter of François Mitterrand

French-language surnames